The Pattern 1907 bayonet, officially called the Sword bayonet, pattern 1907 (Mark I), was a British bayonet designed to be used with the Short Magazine Lee Enfield (SMLE) rifle. The Pattern 1907 bayonet was used by the British and Commonwealth forces throughout both the First and Second World Wars.

Design
The Pattern 1907 bayonet consisted of a one-piece steel blade and tang, with a crossguard and pommel made from wrought iron or mild steel, and a wooden grip usually of walnut secured to the tang by two screws. Originally the bayonet featured a hooked lower quillion intended for trapping an enemy's bayonet and possibly disarming opponents when grappling. This was later deemed impractical and replaced with a simpler design from 1913. Often unit armourers subsequently removed the hooked quillion when the bayonet was sent for repair, although there is no evidence that this was officially directed.

The Pattern 1907 bayonet was supplied with a simple leather scabbard flitted with a steel top-mount and chape, and usually carried from the belt by a simple frog. The Pattern 1907 bayonet attached to the SMLE by a boss located below the barrel on the nose of the rifle and a mortise groove on the pommel of the bayonet.

Markings

Official marks were stamped onto the Pattern 1907 bayonet's ricasso. On British manufactured bayonets the right side included an 'X' bend-test mark, a broad arrow government acceptance mark, and one or more Royal Small Arms Factory appointed inspector's marks, on the left side was the date of the bayonet's official inspection and the maker's name and the reigning monarch's crown and royal cypher, 'ER' (Edward Rex) or after 1910 'GR' (Georgius Rex), the latter being the Latinised version of his name.

Indian bayonets were marked similarly to British bayonets except the royal cypher read 'GRI' (Georgius Rex Imperator) and the manufacturer's mark was 'R.F.I.' (Rifle Factory Ishapore). Australian bayonets differed in the manufacturer's marks, with 'Lithgow' (Lithgow Small Arms Factory), 'MA' (Mangrovite Arsenal) and 'OA' (Orange Arsenal). The wooden grips of World War II era Australian bayonets were often marked 'SLAZ' for Slazenger, who made the grips during that war.

History
British military strategists were fearful that the British infantry would be at a disadvantage when engaged in a bayonet duel with enemy soldiers who retained a longer reach. Bayonet fighting drills formed a significant part of a contemporary British infantryman’s training. Soldiers were drilled in various stances and parrying techniques against an enemy also armed with rifle and bayonet.

In 1906–7 the British Army conducted trials to find a new longer standard issue bayonet. Experiments were conducted with a number of foreign bayonet designs, including a modified version of the American Model 1905 bayonet and the Japanese Type 30 bayonet. The trials resulted in the British Army adopting its own version of the Type 30 bayonet. The new design was designated Sword bayonet, pattern 1907 (Mark I) and was officially introduced on 30 January 1908.

Approximately 5,000,000 Pattern 1907 bayonets were made in Britain during World War I. The makers were Wilkinson Sword, Sanderson Brothers & Newbould Ltd, James A. Chapman, Robert Mole & Sons, and Vickers Ltd. Additionally, Remington UMC produced approximately 100,000 during the war. The Pattern 1907 bayonet was manufactured in India from 1911 to 1940 at the Rifle Factory Ishapore and in Australia from 1913 to 1927, and then again between 1940 and 1945 at the Lithgow Small Arms Factory.

The Pattern 1907 bayonet was adopted by most of the British Commonwealth along with the SMLE. It saw broad front line service until 1945, seeing service in both World War I and World War II. It remained in Australian and Indian service for some time after 1945.

In 1926 the 1907 bayonet was reclassified as the 'Bayonet, No.1, Mk.1'

Variants

Pattern 1913 bayonet
The Pattern 1913 bayonet was designed to be used with the experimental Pattern 1913 Enfield. The Pattern 1913 bayonet's only functional difference from the Pattern 1907 bayonet was a longer cross guard for the muzzle ring, to fit the Pattern 1913 Enfield rifle. Upon the outbreak of World War I the British authorities adapted the Pattern 1913 Enfield to the .303 British cartridge, creating the Pattern 1914 Enfield rifle, and contracts were awarded to the United States arms manufacturers Winchester, Remington and Eddystone for the rifle's production. To accompany those rifles, Remington manufactured the 1,243,000 Pattern 1913 bayonets and Winchester produced 225,000.

The Pattern 1917 bayonet cannot be fixed to the Lee-Enfield rifle (because of the different muzzle ring heights), so to avoid confusion with the Pattern 1907 bayonet, two deep vertical grooves were cut into the wooden grips of the Pattern 1913 bayonet.

Model 1917 bayonet

Upon their entry into World War I, the United States military adapted the Pattern 1914 Enfield rifle to the .30-06 Springfield cartridge to make up for shortfalls in production of the Model 1903 Springfield rifles, creating the substitute standard Model 1917 Enfield rifle. To accompany the M1917 rifle, the United States simply adopted the Pattern 1913 bayonet as the Model 1917 bayonet. Over 2,000,000 Model 1917 bayonets were manufactured in the United States during the war, including 545,000 Pattern 1913 bayonets manufactured for but not delivered to the British military, that were simply re-stamped as Model 1917 bayonets. The Model 1917 bayonet was adopted unchanged to be used with United States Army combat shotguns. After the war, the M1917 bayonet was retained for use with combat shotguns, and remained in United States service until the 1980s.

India Pattern bayonets
I*. The India Pattern No. 1 Mk. Both were recognisable by the fuller, which now ran the length of the blade. The India Pattern No. 1 Mk. II and the India Pattern No. 1 Mk. II* were newly manufactured versions with 12.2 inch blades that had no fuller, the latter having a false edge on top side. Both retained the Pattern 1907 hilt and grip. The India Pattern No. 1 Mk. III and the India Pattern No. 1 Mk. III* were similar to the No. 1 Mk. II and No. 1 Mk. II* except they had crude squared pommels and rectangular grips, and were finished with black paint.

See also
 Sword bayonet

References

Bayonets
World War I British infantry weapons
World War II infantry weapons of the United Kingdom